Stephen Alvin Bradford (15 July 1963 – 25 August 2012) was an English cricketer.  Bradford was a left-handed batsman who bowled slow left-arm orthodox.  He was born in Lincoln, Lincolnshire.

Bradford made his debut for Lincolnshire in the 1984 Minor Counties Championship against Staffordshire.  Bradford played Minor counties cricket for Lincolnshire from 1984 to 2000, which included 87 Minor Counties Championship matches and 22 MCCA Knockout Trophy matches.  He made his List A debut against Gloucestershire in the 1996 NatWest Trophy.  He played 2 further List A matches for Lincolnshire, against Derbyshire in the 1997 NatWest Trophy and Wales Minor Counties in the 1999 NatWest Trophy.  In his 3 matches, he scored 29 runs at an average of 14.50, with a high score of 15 not out.  With the ball, he took 4 wickets at a bowling average of 26.00, with best figures of 2/52.

References

External links
Stephen Bradford at ESPNcricinfo
Stephen Bradford at CricketArchive

1963 births
2012 deaths
Cricketers from Lincoln, England
English cricketers
Lincolnshire cricketers